"Each Time You Break My Heart" is a song recorded by British singer Nick Kamen, for his eponymous debut studio album (1987). It was released by Sire Records on 2 November 1986 as his debut single in 7-inch and 12-inch maxi formats. Kamen had gained popularity by starring in a 1985 Levi's television commercial, later deciding to delve into music business and signed a record deal with Sire. "Each Time You Break My Heart" was the lead single from his album, written and produced by Madonna and Stephen Bray. It was originally set to be included on Madonna's third studio album, True Blue (1986), but failed to make the final track list. Madonna also provided background vocals on the track.

A promotional video to accompany the single was directed by Jean-Baptiste Mondino. The synth-pop song was featured in Billboard magazine's "New and Noteworthy" single list, receiving comparison to songs by the Bee Gees. It was a commercial success, reaching the top ten of the record charts in France, Germany, Ireland, Netherlands, Sweden, Switzerland and the United Kingdom. It attained Silver certification in France and the United Kingdom, and a remix of the track became a dance hit in the United States.

Background and recording
Nick Kamen attained popularity in 1985 when his modelling career gave him the chance to star in Levi's television commercial. It showed him coming into a launderette to wash his 501 jeans, wearing only white boxer shorts. As he strips down he is watched by a group of women in the launderette. The advertisement had immediate impact, with Levi's sales increasing by 800% and making it the number one jeans manufacturer. It also made Kamen a household name and a sex symbol. Singer Marvin Gaye's "I Heard It Through the Grapevine" was featured in the commercial and its sales were also boosted, resulting in the song reaching number eight on the UK Singles Chart.

Kamen later decided to delve into music, and released his eponymous debut album in 1987. Written and produced by Madonna and Stephen Bray, "Each Time You Break My Heart" was selected as the lead single from the album. Madonna had previously expressed interest in producing Kamen's record when the latter was signed with Sire Records. However, since she was busy shooting for her film, Who's That Girl (then titled Slammer), she chose to write and compose one song. Madonna had originally written and recorded the song for her third studio album, True Blue (1986), but it did not make the final track list. "Each Time You Break My Heart" also contains background vocals by the singer. The Latin Rascals handled the editing of the track, which was engineered by Steve Peck. Recording and mixing of "Each Time You Break My Heart" was performed by Michael Hutchinson at New York's Sigma Sound Studios, while Ted Jensen did the precision lacquer mastering of the song at Sterling Sound Studios in New York. An extended dance/club remix was composed by Shep Pettibone, which reached number five on the Dance Club Songs chart in the United States.

Release and reception

"Each Time You Break My Heart" was released on 2 November 1986 by Sire in 7" and 12" maxi formats. Photographer Robert Erdman shot the cover artwork photograph of the 7" single, showing Kamen smiling. Another photographer Bob Merlis shot the picture listed in the back cover, which is a black-and-white image of Madonna and Kamen in a recording studio. A promotional video for the song was directed by Jean-Baptiste Mondino. It featured Kamen's then girlfriend, actress Talisa Soto and Felix Howard A writer for Billboard magazine listed the dance mix of the song as one of the "New and Noteworthy" singles released, believing that the combination of the writer and the producer duo, along with Kamen's looks would make the track popular. The reviewer added that the song was musically "light synth-pop" and Kamen's vocals were reminiscent of the Bee Gees.

In the United Kingdom, "Each Time You Break My Heart" debuted at number 54 on the UK Singles Chart. After four weeks, the song reached a peak of number five on the chart, staying within the top 100 for a total of 13 weeks. It received a Silver certification from the British Phonographic Industry (BPI) for shipment of 250,000 copies of the single. In France, "Each Time You Break My Heart" attained a peak position of number eight on the French Singles Chart, and was present for a total of 19 weeks. The Syndicat National de l'Édition Phonographique (SNEP) certified it Silver for shipping 250,000 copies of the single. Across Europe the song also attained the top ten positions in the record charts of Germany, Ireland, Netherlands, Sweden and Switzerland. On the combined pan-European Hot 100 Singles chart, it peaked at number 11. In the United States, the song failed to chart on the Billboard Hot 100, but a club remix by Shep Pettibone achieved a peak of number five on the Dance Club Songs chart.

Track listings

7" single
 "Each Time You Break My Heart" (Album Version) – 4:30
 "Each Time You Break My Heart" (Instrumental) – 4:35

12" maxi – Europe
 "Each Time You Break My Heart" (Dance Mix) – 6:52
 "Each Time You Break My Heart" (Album Version) – 4:30
 "Each Time You Break My Heart" (Extended Instrumental) – 5:14

12" maxi – US
 "Each Time You Break My Heart" (Shep Pettibone Extended Version) – 8:32
 "Each Time You Break My Heart" (Shep Pettibone Dub) – 8:49
 "Each Time You Break My Heart" (Shep Pettibone Radio Mix) – 3:55

Credits and personnel
Credits adapted from the 12-inch maxi single liner notes.

 Nick Kamen – primary and background vocals
 Madonna – writer, producer, background vocals
 Stephen Bray – writer, producer
 Michael Hutchinson – recording, mixing
 The Latin Rascals – audio editing
 Ted Jensen – audio mastering
 Steve Peck – audio engineering
 Shep Pettibone – remixing

Charts

Weekly charts

Year-end charts

Certifications

See also
 List of UK Singles Chart top 10 singles (1986)
 List of UK Singles Chart top 10 singles (1987)

Notes

References

External links
 
 

1986 debut singles
1986 songs
Music videos directed by Jean-Baptiste Mondino
Nick Kamen songs
Songs written by Madonna
Songs written by Stephen Bray
Song recordings produced by Madonna
Song recordings produced by Stephen Bray
Sire Records singles